In Greek mythology, the figure of Horkos (Ancient Greek:) personifies the curse that will be inflicted on any person who swears a false oath. He was the avenger of perjury and the punitive companion of the goddess Dike (Justice). 

In Aesop's Fables there is a cautionary tale, numbered 239 in the Perry Index, indicating that retribution is swift where the god is defied. Oath-taking and the penalties for perjuring oneself played an important part in the Ancient Greek concept of justice.

Family

Hesiod's account 
Hesiod's Theogony identifies Horkos as the son of Eris ("strife") and brother of various tribulations: Dysnomia ("Anarchy"), Ate ("Ruin") and other malevolent daemons.

 "And hateful Eris bore painful Ponos ("Hardship"),
 Lethe ("Forgetfulness") and Limos ("Starvation") and the tearful Algos ("Pains"),
 Hysminai ("Battles"), Makhai ("Wars"), Phonoi ("Murders"), and Androktasiai ("Manslaughters");
 Neikea ("Quarrels"), Pseudea ("Lies"), Logoi ("Stories"), Amphillogiai ("Disputes")
 Dysnomia ("Anarchy") and Ate ("Ruin"), near one another,
 and Horkos ("Oath"), who most afflicts men on earth,
 Then willing swears a false oath."

Hyginus' account 
In another account, Horcus/ Jusjurandum was the offspring of the primordial deities Aether and Gaia.

 From Aether (Air) and Terra/ Gaia (Earth) [were born]: Dolor/ Algos (Pain), Dolus (Guile), Ira/ Lyssa (Anger), Luctus/ Penthus (Lamentation), Mendacium/ Pseudologoi (Lies), Jusjurandum/ Horcus (Oath), Ultio/ Poine (Vengeance), Intemperantia (Intemperance), Altercatio/ Amphillogiai (Altercation), Oblivio/ Lethe (Forgetfulness), Socordia/ Aergia (Sloth), Timor/ Phobos (Fear), Superbia (Arrogance), Incestum (Sacrilege), Pugna/ Hysminai (Combat).

Mythology
In his Works and Days, Hesiod states that the Erinyes (Furies) assisted at the birth of Horkos, "whom Eris bore, to be a plague on those who take false oath", and that the fifth day of each month was especially dangerous as being the day on which he was born.  However, according to the moral given in an ethical parable related by Aesop, there is no fixed day on which the god's punishment falls on the wicked.

Aesop's fable concerns a man who had taken a deposit from a friend and, when asked to swear an oath regarding it, left the town hurriedly. A lame man whom he met told his fellow-traveller that he was Horkos on his way to track down wicked people.  The man asked Horkos how often he returned to the city they were leaving. "I come back after forty years, or sometimes thirty," Horkos replied. Believing himself to be free from danger, the man returned the following morning and swore that he had never received the deposit.  Almost immediately, Horkos arrived to execute the perjurer by throwing him off a cliff. Protesting, the man asked why the god had said he was not coming back for years when in fact he did not grant even a day's reprieve. Horkos replied, "You should also know that if somebody intends to provoke me, I am accustomed to come back again the very same day."

Concepts of justice

A similar story was told by Herodotus and may even have been the fable's origin. It concerned a man who asked the Delphic oracle's advice about dishonouring such an oath and received the answer that he would profit for the moment but that it would bring about the destruction of him and his heirs - for Horkos has a son 'who is nameless and without hands or feet, swift in pursuit'. Nor can there be any repentance, for intent is no different from action.

The severity of such justice underlines the importance of oath-taking in Ancient Greece, which was undertaken in the name of the gods. To perjure oneself meant waging war on the gods, who even themselves could suffer under the same sanctions. In taking an oath one called down a conditional curse on oneself, to take effect if one lied or broke one's promise. The lasting nature of this curse, and the corresponding benefit of honouring one's word, is also emphasised by Hesiod in discussing the matter: "Whoever wilfully swears a false oath, telling a lie in his testimony, he himself is incurably hurt at the same time as he harms Justice, and in after times his family is left more obscure, whereas the family of the man who keeps his oath is better in after times."

In later times, the role of bringing justice for broken oaths was undertaken by the Furies, specified by Hesiod as the midwives at the birth of Horkos. Justice was also under the protection of the King of the gods, who in this aspect is referred to as Zeus Horkios (guardian of oaths); in circumstances where other divine entities were named, they too took responsibility for retribution.

Notes

References 

 Alan H. Sommerstein, Isabelle C. Torrance, Oaths and Swearing in Ancient Greece, Berlin 2014
 Gaius Julius Hyginus, Fabulae from The Myths of Hyginus translated and edited by Mary Grant. University of Kansas Publications in Humanistic Studies. Online version at the Topos Text Project.
 Herodotus, The Histories with an English translation by A. D. Godley. Cambridge. Harvard University Press. 1920. . Online version at the Topos Text Project. Greek text available at Perseus Digital Library.
 Hesiod, Theogony from The Homeric Hymns and Homerica with an English Translation by Hugh G. Evelyn-White, Cambridge, MA.,Harvard University Press; London, William Heinemann Ltd. 1914. Online version at the Perseus Digital Library. Greek text available from the same website.
 Hesiod, Works and Days from The Homeric Hymns and Homerica with an English Translation by Hugh G. Evelyn-White, Cambridge, MA.,Harvard University Press; London, William Heinemann Ltd. 1914. Online version at the Perseus Digital Library. Greek text available from the same website.

Greek gods
Personifications in Greek mythology
Children of Eris (mythology)
Aesop's Fables
Curses